The 2021 Prague Open (branded as the 2021 Livesport Prague Open for sponsorship reasons) was a professional women's tennis tournament played on outdoor hard courts at the TK Sparta Praha. It was the 12th (WTA and non-WTA) edition of the tournament which was part of the 2021 WTA Tour, and of the 250 series of tournaments. It took place in Prague, Czech Republic between 12 and 18 July 2021. This was the first edition of the tournament held on outdoor hard courts, as opposed to clay courts in previous editions.

Champions

Singles 

  Barbora Krejčíková def.  Tereza Martincová, 6–2, 6–0.

This was Krejčíková's third WTA singles title of the year.

Doubles 

  Marie Bouzková /  Lucie Hradecká def.  Viktória Kužmová /  Nina Stojanović, 7–6(7–3), 6–4.

Singles main draw entrants

Seeds 

 Rankings are as of June 28, 2021

Other entrants 
The following players received wildcards into the singles main draw:
  Lucie Havlíčková
  Viktória Kužmová
  Samantha Stosur

The following players received entry using protected rankings:
  Vitalia Diatchenko
  Samantha Murray Sharan
  Tereza Smitková

The following player received entry as a special exempt:
  Elena-Gabriela Ruse

The following players received entry from the qualifying draw:
  Naiktha Bains
  Jodie Burrage 
  Asia Muhammad 
  Urszula Radwańska
  Isabella Shinikova
  Rebecca Šramková 

The following players received entry as lucky losers:
  Anastasia Gasanova
  Liang En-shuo
  Conny Perrin

Withdrawals 
Before the tournament
  Belinda Bencic → replaced by  Maddison Inglis
  Océane Dodin → replaced by  Samantha Murray Sharan
  Hsieh Su-wei → replaced by  Conny Perrin
  Ons Jabeur → replaced by  Leonie Küng
  Daria Kasatkina → replaced by  Wang Xinyu
  Claire Liu → replaced by  Tereza Smitková
  Tsvetana Pironkova → replaced by  Grace Min
  Elena-Gabriela Ruse → replaced by  Anastasia Gasanova
  Clara Tauson → replaced by  Nuria Párrizas Díaz
  Ajla Tomljanović → replaced by  Lizette Cabrera
  Markéta Vondroušová → replaced by  Liang En-shuo
  Heather Watson → replaced by  Giulia Gatto-Monticone
  Vera Zvonareva → replaced by  Storm Sanders

Doubles main draw entrants

Seeds 

 1 Rankings are as of June 28, 2021

Other entrants 
The following pairs received wildcards into the doubles main draw:
  Lucie Havlíčková /  Miriam Kolodziejová
  Linda Klimovičová /  Barbora Palicová

Withdrawals 
Before the tournament
  Anastasia Gasanova /  Natalija Kostić → replaced by  Anastasia Gasanova /  Isabella Shinikova
  Ellen Perez /  Samantha Stosur → replaced by  Jodie Burrage /  Samantha Stosur
  Ankita Raina /  Rosalie van der Hoek → replaced by  Conny Perrin /  Rosalie van der Hoek

Retirements
  Conny Perrin /  Rosalie van der Hoek

References

External links 
 Official website

Prague Open

Livesport
2021
Prague Open
2021 Prague Open